Sisurcana leptina is a species of moth of the family Tortricidae. It is found in Pichincha-Septimo Paraiso Reserve in Ecuador.

The wingspan is about 18.5 mm. The ground colour of the forewings is brownish with a cinnamon hue and blackish brown suffusions and lines. The markings are black-brown. The hindwings are grey-brown.

Etymology
The species name refers to the appearance of the species and is derived from leptina (meaning delicate).

References

Moths described in 2004
Sisurcana
Moths of South America
Taxa named by Józef Razowski